Rohini Sindhuri Dasari (born 30 May 1984) is an Indian bureaucrat. She is an Indian administrative officer of Karnataka cadre from the 2009 batch and currently serving as Commissioner of Hindu Religious Institutions And Charitable Endowments Department. She worked in various departments in her career as an IAS officer. She served as the Deputy Commissioner of Mysore district.

Early life
Sindhuri was born on 30 May 1984 in Andhra Pradesh. She studied B. Tech., Chemical engineering. She has been selected as an IAS officer of the 2009 batch. Sindhuri is married to Sudhir reddy, a Software Engineer from Bengaluru, Karnataka and they have a son and a daughter. She is fluent in several languages, including Telugu, Kannada and English.

Career
Sindhuri's first posting as a civil servant was as the assistant commissioner in Tumakuru from 29 August 2011 to 31 August 2012. In the same period she was in charge commissioner of the urban development department of Tumakuru and continued in the post until 31 December 2012. As commissioner she had computerised tax collection at source, was able to take possession of 42 acres of corporation land at Ajjagondanahalli village which was pending since 2006, auctioned shops of the corporation which were lying vacant, generating revenue worth 10crore for the corporation, was instrumental in removal of encroachments on Horpete road, J.C.road and kyathsandra main roads. She is fondly remembered by Tumkur people for removing encroachments on M.G.Road and completing the road work in the busiest road of the district.

She has then worked as the Director of Rural Development & Panchayat Raj Department, Self Employment Project, Bangalore from 10 August 2013 to 31 May 2014. The next she posted as the chief executive officer of the Mandya Zilla Panchayat where she worked for more than one year.

As Chief Executive Officer of Mandya ZP
On 31 May 2014, Sindhuri posted as the CEO of Mandya ZP. Sindhuri launched a drive to provide individual toilets to 1.02 lakh households during 2014–15. And, since July last, it had constructed 1,00,000 individual toilets across the district which made the district No. 1 in the Swachh Bharat Abhiyan in the state and 3rd in India. Sindhuri successfully utilised the Central government's grant of 65 crore for drinking water and by using this grant, Sindhuri and her team instituted 100 pure drinking water units across the district. Union government recognized this and provided 6 crore extra for the same purpose. As Mandya is an agricultural district growing mainly sugarcane and paddy, she started the program of identifying 100 farmers and educating them on Integrated farming practices and providing bank linkage to them to encourage sustainable farming practices. She also took a serious view of female foeticide in the district and organised the health department and ASHA workers in reporting such incidents and educating parents against this practice.
In a first of its kind project in the State, as CEO of Mandya Zilla Panchayat she had launched a mobile app for downloading property documents which would help many people to get their property documents without running around offices

Munjaane programme
She used to meet villagers early morning to promote to have individual toilets. This programme called Munjaane and it received good response and well appreciated.

Recognition by the central government
Sindhuri's performance in implementing the Swatcch Bharat Abhiyan (SBA) in Mandya District, got recognized in the country and she got selected by the Union Government as one of the three resource persons to train DCs in New Delhi in 2015.

Karnataka Food & Civil Supplies Corporation Limited
Sindhuri served as the managing director of Karnataka Food & Civil Supplies Corporation Limited, Bangalore, since from 16 September 2015.

As Deputy Commissioner of Hassan

Sindhuri was posted as Deputy Commissioner of Hassan on July, 2017. Here she was first tasked with works of Mahamastakabhisheka, the ceremony of anointing the 57-foot monolithic statue of Bahubali at Shravanabelagola. Which she successfully conducted.

In 2019 Hassan District stood first in SSLC results because of the importance she gave to education. In 2017 when she came to district it stood 31 in the state which was just 2 places above the last district. In two years she gave lot of importance to education sector.

She also controlled the Sand mafia which was very prevalent in the district. She conducted many raid and confiscated lot of illegal equipments because of which she was transferred many times.

Spandana Online Portal
She also launched Spandana, an online grievance redressal system which was first in the state on 1 January 2019.

Controversial transfer
Sindhuri was issued a transfer in January 2018, just seven months into her job as the district collector (DC) of Hassan, after being appointed in July 2017. The transfer was due to the pressure from the local politician and Ex-Minister H. D. Revanna, then she approached the High Court, which directed to stall the transfer. Chief minister H D Kumaraswamy reappointed her as a Hassan DC.

References

Indian Administrative Service officers
People from Andhra Pradesh
Living people
1984 births